The Citroën Acadiane is a small commercial vehicle derived from the Dyane and only available in left-hand drive, produced from 1977 to 1987. Production totalled 253,393. The Visa-based C15 van eventually replaced the Acadiane.

Citroën had already used the prefix AK for its light commercials, so it was an obvious pun to name the AK Dyane "Acadiane" (similar pronunciation in French).  There was no connection beyond the pun with the French-speaking region of Louisiana that is home to Cajun (Acadiane) cooking, or with l'Acadie, now part of Nova Scotia.

The Acadiane differed from the Dyane on which it was based in having heavier-duty suspension, a slightly altered chassis and a rear-brake limiter whose action was dependent on the load.

The Acadiane was also fitted with wind-down windows in the driver's and passenger's doors. The Dyane car had horizontally-sliding windows.

The Acadiane was available in commercial (two-seater) form or as a "Mixte", with sliding rear windows and a removable rear bench seat.  Citroën and many other manufacturers continue to this day (Berlingo et al.) with the option of rear seats in a vehicle clearly designed as a commercial.  The Mixte version also had a passenger sun visor, missing in the more basic commercial version.
In line with many Citroën light commercials, the roof of the rear bodywork was corrugated to add extra rigidity at little cost.

Top gear in the four-speed box was usually referred to as overdrive. This had been so since the earliest days of the 2CV. In most circumstances it was best used as such. Progress could be maintained in top, but further acceleration was unlikely. The Adadiane came from the factory with Michelin 15x135 tyres, 10mm wider than those fitted to the 2CV and Dyane cars.

Production history

References

External links 

Dyane/Acadiane links Citroën World
Acadiane on the road!
CitCity
Citroën Acadiane at Citroenet
Acadiane 1/43 modelcar

Acadiane
Vehicles introduced in 1977
Cars powered by boxer engines
Articles containing video clips